The 1994–95 St. Louis Blues season was the 28th in franchise history. The season started with good fortunes for the Blues, as Mike Keenan, who had coached the 1993–94 New York Rangers to the Stanley Cup, signed with the team in the off-season. The Blues also acquired four players from the Cup-winning Rangers: Glenn Anderson, Greg Gilbert, Doug Lidster and Esa Tikkanen. On April 16, 1995, captain Brett Hull had his first-ever four-goal game in a 6–5 win over the Detroit Red Wings.

The Blues played strong all season and finished third in the Conference. They powered their way to fourth place in scoring in the league with 178 goals.

Off-season
The Blues moved from their home in the arena where they had played since their inception to the newly built Kiel Center.  The inaugural game was set to be played against their rivals, the Chicago Blackhawks, but the NHL lockout kept this game from being played.  The first official game wasn't played until January 1995.  The regular season was shortened to 48 games.

Regular season
The Blues scored 135 even-strength goals during the regular season, the most among all 26 NHL teams and tied the Washington Capitals for the fewest short-handed goals allowed (2).

Final standings

Schedule and results

Playoffs

With all its firepower and playoff experience, St. Louis was heavily favored to beat 6th place Vancouver in the first round of the 1995 NHL playoffs. However, after winning game 1, the Blues dropped the next two games and never regained the series lead. After a tough overtime loss in game 5, the Blues fought back in game 6 with an explosive 8–2 victory at the Pacific Coliseum in Vancouver to tie the series at 3–3. In game 7 at the Kiel Center, the Blues outshot the Canucks 44–22, but Vancouver goaltender Kirk McLean was solid in net, making 41 saves; St. Louis goaltender Curtis Joseph struggled, allowing 4 goals on only 21 shots. Pavel Bure added an empty-net goal with 22 seconds remaining in the third period to give the Canucks a 5–3 win and the series 4 games to 3.

Player statistics

Regular season
Scoring

Goaltending

Playoffs
Scoring

Goaltending

Awards and records

Transactions
July 24, 1994 – Doug Lidster was traded by the New York Rangers, along with Esa Tikkanen, to the St. Louis Blues in exchange for Petr Nedved.

Draft picks
St. Louis's draft picks at the 1994 NHL Entry Draft held at the Hartford Civic Center in Hartford, Connecticut.

References
 Blues on Hockey Database

S
S
St. Louis Blues seasons
St
St